Hiroyuki Yoshino (born 1974) is a Japanese voice actor.

Hiroyuki Yoshino may refer to:

Hiroyuki Yoshino (screenwriter) (born 1970), Japanese screenwriter
Hiroyuki Yoshino (kickboxer), former national Japanese champion and early member of the All Japan Kickboxing Federation
Hiroyuki Yoshino (engineer), former president of Honda Motor Company from 1998 to 2003
Hiroyuki Yoshino (football executive), former president of the Japanese football team Júbilo Iwata
Hiroyuki Yoshino (The Idolmaster), a character in the Idolmaster franchise